Pope Donus II was a non-existent pope who was at one time shown in the official lists of popes.

He was mistakenly inserted after Pope Benedict VI.  The name comes from a confusion of the title domnus (dominus) and the Roman name Donus (LP II, XVIII, and 256).

References

Legendary popes